Antonio González may refer to:

Antonio González Velázquez (1723-1793), Spanish late-Baroque painter
Antonio González de Balcarce (1774–1819), Argentine military commander
Antonio González Caballero (1927–2003), Mexican painter, pedagogue and screenwriter
Antonio González (footballer) (born 1936), Paraguyan footballer 
Antonio González Álvarez (born 1940), Spanish retired footballer
Antonio González (javelin thrower) (born 1956), Cuban javelin thrower
Antonio González (field hockey) (born 1969), Spanish former field hockey goalkeeper
Antonio González (race walker), Spanish racewalker
Antonio González Rodríguez (born 1982), Spanish footballer
Antonio Gonzalez Middle School, Texas 
Antonio González (martyr) (died 1637), Roman Catholic martyr and saint
Antonio González, 1st Marquess of Valdeterrazo (1792–1876), Spanish politician, diplomat and lawyer
Antonio González de Aguilar, 8th Marquis of la Vega de Armijo (1824–1908), Spanish noble and politician
Antonio Vidal González (born 1964), Argentine footballer

See also
Tony Gonzalez (disambiguation)